George K. Brandriff (1890 - August 15, 1936) was an American painter, and the president of the Laguna Beach Art Association. He committed suicide at age 46.

Life 
Brandriff was born in 1890 in Millville, New Jersey. He grew up in Vineland, New Jersey and moved to California in 1913 to attend the University of Southern California.

Brandriff became a painter in the art colony of Laguna Beach, California, and he served as the president of the Laguna Beach Art Association. He was also a member of the California Art Club. He exhibited his work in many museums, including the Biltmore Salon, the Los Angeles Museum, and the Pennsylvania Academy of Fine Arts.

Brandriff married Frances Conder. He committed suicide by shooting himself on August 15, 1936, in Laguna Beach, at age 46.

References

1890 births
1936 suicides
People from Millville, New Jersey
People from Laguna Beach, California
University of Southern California alumni
American male painters
Painters from California
20th-century American painters
Painters who committed suicide
Suicides by firearm in California
20th-century American male artists